Frankel & Curtis was an architectural firm of Lexington, Kentucky.  It was a partnership of Leon K. Frankel and of John J. Curtis, along with associates James Slaughter Frankel and Melbourne Mills.  A successor name is Frankel, Curtis & Coleman.  Under this name, the firm received a 1963 American Institute of Architects Kentucky award, its Honor Award merit prize, for its Admin. Bldg., of the Spindletop Research Center, in Lexington, Kentucky.

A number of their works are listed on the National Register of Historic Places.

Works include:
Admin Building, Spindletop Research Center, Lexington, Kentucky
Cadentown School, 705 Caden Ln., Lexington, Kentucky, NRHP-listed
Charles W. Caldwell House, 0.2 mi N of KY 34, 0.6 mi W of KY 127, Danville, Kentucky, NRHP-listed
Elizabethtown Armory, 205 Warfield St., Elizabethtown, Kentucky, NRHP-listed
Fohs Hall, 143 N. Walker St., Marion, Kentucky, NRHP-listed
Garth School, 501 S. Hamilton St., Georgetown, Kentucky, NRHP-listed
Lexington Herald Building, 121 Walnut St., Lexington, Kentucky, NRHP-listed
Lexington Laundry Company Building, 139 E. Main St., Lexington, Kentucky, NRHP-listed as a contributing resource in the Downtown Commercial District
Russell Theatre, 9 E. Third St., Maysville, Kentucky, NRHP-listed
Second Presbyterian Church, 460 E. Main St., Lexington, Kentucky, NRHP-listed
Somerset Armory, 109 Grand Ave., Somerset, Kentucky, NRHP-listed
Wolf Wile Department Store Building, 248–250 E. Main St., Lexington, Kentucky, NRHP-listed

References

External links
 Guide to the Frankel and Curtis architectural drawings collection, dated 1897-1974 housed at the University of Kentucky Libraries Special Collections Research Center

Companies based in Lexington, Kentucky
Defunct architecture firms based in Kentucky